Mioclanis is an extinct genus of moths in the family Sphingidae, containing one species Mioclanis shanwangiana which is known from Shandong in China. It is dated to the Miocene.

References 

†
Fossil Lepidoptera
Miocene insects
Prehistoric animals of China
Fossil taxa described in 1994
†